Shlomo Karhi (born 6 April 1982) is an Israeli academic and politician. He is currently a member of the Knesset for Likud and serving as the Minister of Communications in the thirty-seventh government.

Biography
Karhi was born in Ramat Gan into a religious family, and was the oldest of seventeen siblings. At the age of four he moved to the Zimrat moshav.  He was educated at the Kisse Rahamim and Mercaz HaRav yeshivas. He subsequently served in the Netzah Yehuda Battalion during his national service in the Israel Defense Forces, before earning a BA in management accounting and information systems at the Jerusalem College of Technology, and a master's degree and PhD in industrial engineering and management at Ben-Gurion University of the Negev. He began work as a lecturer at Sapir Academic College, before becoming part of the faculty at Ben-Gurion University and then Bar-Ilan University.

Karhi was placed twenty-fifth on the Likud list for the April 2019 elections,  a slot reserved for candidates from the Negev. He was subsequently elected to the Knesset as Likud won 36 seats. He was re-elected in the September 2019 and March 2020 elections after being placed twenty-seventh on the Likud list, and was re-elected again in 2021 (in twenty-fourth place) and 2022 (in thirteenth place).

References

External links

1982 births
Living people
Academic staff of Bar-Ilan University
Ben-Gurion University of the Negev alumni
Academic staff of Ben-Gurion University of the Negev
Israeli Orthodox Jews
Israeli people of Tunisian-Jewish descent
Jerusalem College of Technology alumni
Jewish Israeli politicians
Likud politicians
Members of the 21st Knesset (2019)
Members of the 22nd Knesset (2019–2020)
Members of the 23rd Knesset (2020–2021)
Members of the 24th Knesset (2021–2022)
Members of the 25th Knesset (2022–)
Mercaz HaRav alumni
Moshavniks
People from Southern District (Israel)
Academic staff of Sapir Academic College